Iraqi–Serbian relations are foreign relations between Iraq and Serbia. Iraq has an embassy in Belgrade, and Serbia has an embassy in Baghdad.

In recent times, relations between Iraq and Serbia consist of mostly military trade. In 2010, Serbian foreign Minister Vuk Jeremić said after talks with Iraqi Prime Minister Nouri al-Maliki that Serbia and Iraq share a common stance on international law and issues of territorial integrity and sovereignty.

Both countries were part of the Ottoman Empire.

History

Yugoslav relations with Ba'ath-era Iraq 
The state of Yugoslavia established a large engineering and technology presence in Iraq from when Saddam Hussein entered office in his country. Upon the 2003 Iraq invasion, Western military analysts referred to maps and advice from former engineers of the now-defunct Serbian company Aeroinzenjering, which had built Saddam Hussein's underground bunkers along with many airports in Iraq by the 1980s.

Later on, in the 1990s when FR Yugoslavia was isolated by Western sanctions, Belgrade-based Yugoimport designed and built Ba'ath party headquarters in Baghdad along with an additional five underground bunkers for Saddam Hussein; Yugoimport's blueprints of the bunkers in which Hussein and loyalists hid during the United States invasion merited enough importance that they were handed over to the United States when the invasion began.

A rumor was speculated by the media in 1999 during the NATO bombing of Yugoslavia that Serbia's Slobodan Milošević and Iraq's Saddam Hussein allegedly negotiated a discreet military alliance that would improve their ability to defy the West and withstand Allied bombing attacks, along with low-profile support from Russia and China, according to reports from London.

Boka Star seizure

In 2002, a Yugoslav ship Boka Star, owned by a Montenegrin named Marko Balić was seized by the United States Navy after it was tipped off to have a large weapons shipment to Iraq. The Federal Republic of Yugoslavia was one of the only countries in the world to have continued military shipments to Iraq during sanctions against Iraq and the Hussein regime. The shipment was attempted just a year before the 2003 invasion of Iraq.

Trade 
In March 2008, Serbia signed a $235 million-dollar deal to export weapons and military equipment to Iraq. The deal included the delivery of 20 Utva Lasta aircraft to the Iraqi Air Force, all of which were delivered by early 2012. Information was presented by Serbia's defense minister Dragan Šutanovac. The two nations also stated the wish to plan to bolster defense ties, which would possibly include joint weapons production.

See also 
 Foreign relations of Iraq
 Foreign relations of Serbia
Iraq–Kosovo relations
 Yugoslavia and the Non-Aligned Movement

References

External links 
 Serbian Ministry of Foreign Affairs about relations with Iraq
 Embassy of Serbia in Iraq
 Embassy of Iraq in Serbia

 
Serbia
Bilateral relations of Serbia